Zeuxine oblonga , commonly known as the common jewel orchid is a species of orchid that is endemic to northern Australia. It has up to seven narrow egg-shaped leaves and up to thirty small green and white flowers crowded along a fleshy, hairy flowering stem. It mainly grows in wet forest and rainforest.

Description 
Zeuxine oblonga is a terrestrial, tuberous, perennial herb. The outside surface of the flowers is hairy. The dorsal sepal is green with pink edges, the lateral sepals are green and the petals are white. Flowering occurs from July to September.

Taxonomy and naming
Zeuxine oblonga was first formally described in 1920 by Richard Sanders Rogers and Cyril Tenison White and the description was published in Proceedings of the Royal Society of Queensland. The specific epithet (oblonga) is a Latin word meaning "longer than broad".

Distribution and habitat 
The common jewel orchid is endemic to northern Australia and has been recorded from the far north-east of Western Australia, between the Keep and Adelaide Rivers in the Northern Territory and from the Cape York Peninsula in Queensland to Coffs Harbour in New South Wales. It usually grows in colonies on dark, moist sites on the rainforest floor, and is locally common in swampy areas with peaty soils next to streams.

Conservation 
Potential threats include feral animal disturbance, changes to hydrology and horticultural harvesting.

In Western Australia the species is classified as "Priority Two" by the Western Australian Government Department of Parks and Wildlife meaning that it is poorly known and from only one or a few locations.

References 

oblonga
Endemic orchids of Australia
Orchids of Queensland
Orchids of New South Wales
Orchids of the Northern Territory
Plants described in 1920